Utetheisa limbata is a moth in the family Erebidae. It was described by Walter Karl Johann Roepke in 1949. It is found on Sulawesi.

References

Moths described in 1949
limbata